Marinus is a male given name, derived from Latin marinus meaning "marine; of or pertaining to the sea". It is used in the Netherlands as a given name, though most people use a short form in daily life, like Marijn, Mario, René, Rien, Rini, Riny, or Rinus.  It may refer to:

Ancient
Marinus of Tyre (70–130), Hellenized geographer, cartographer and mathematician
Julius Marinus (fl. 3rd century), father of Phillip the Arab
Marinus of Caesarea (died 262), Roman soldier and Christian martyr and saint
Saint Marinus (died 366), founder of San Marino
Marinus of Thrace (died c.420), Arian Archbishop of Constantinople
Marinus of Neapolis (born c.440), Neoplatonist philosopher
Marinus (praetorian prefect) (fl. 498-519), Byzantine official and admiral
Pope Marinus
Pope Marinus I (died 884)
Pope Marinus II (died 946)
Marinus, Duke of Gaeta
Marinus I of Gaeta (died 866), Italian duke
Marinus II of Gaeta (died 984), Italian duke
Marinus, Duke of Naples
Marinus I of Naples (died 928), Italian duke
Marinus II of Naples (died 992), Italian duke
Marinus Sebastus of Amalfi, 11th-century Italian duke

Latinized names of Renaissance people
Marinus Sanutus the Elder (Marino Sanuto; c. 1260 – 1338), Venetian statesman and geographer
Marinus Barletius (Marin Barleti; c.1455–1512), Albanian historian
Marinus Sanutus the Younger (Marino Sanuto; 1466–1536), Venetian historian
Marinus Ghetaldus (1568–1626), Ragusan mathematician and physicist
Marinus Bizzius (1570–1624), Venetian patrician in Dalmatia and archbishop

Academics 
Marinus Anton Donk (1908–1972), Dutch mycologist
Marinus H. "Rien" van IJzendoorn (born 1952), Dutch professor of child and family studies
Marinus A. "Rien" Kaashoek (born 1937), Dutch mathematician
 Marinus F. "Frans" Kaashoek  (born 1965), Dutch computer scientist
Marinus Vertregt (1897–1973), Dutch astronomer
Arts
Marinus Andersen 1895–1985), Danish architect
Marinus F.J. "Marijn" Backer (born 1956), Dutch columnist, teacher, poet and writer
Marinus Boezem (born 1934), Dutch sculptor and conceptual artist
Marinus "Rinus" Gerritsen (born 1946), Dutch rock bass guitarist
Marinus Robyn van der Goes (1599–1639), Flemish engraver
Marinus Jan Granpré Molière (1883–1972), Dutch architect
Marinus Heijnes (1888–1963), Dutch impressionist painterp
Marinus de Jong (1891–1984), Dutch-born Belgian composer and pianist 
Marinus Adrianus Koekkoek (1807–1868), Dutch landscape painter
Marinus Adrianus Koekkoek (II) (1873–1944), Dutch landscape and animal painter
Marinus Harm "Rien" Poortvliet (1932–1995), Dutch draughtsman and painter
Marinus van Reymerswaele (c.1490–c.1546), Dutch painter
Marinus Snoeren (1919–1982), Dutch cellist
Marinus Vreugde (1880-1957), Dutch sculptor and graphic artist
Government, military, religion
Marinus Canning (1829–1911), Australian banker and politician
Marinus van der Goes van Naters (1900–2005), Dutch nobleman and Labour politician
Marinus Theodoor "Rene" Hidding (born 1953), Dutch-born Australian politician
Marinus Kok (1916–1982), Dutch Old Catholic archbishop
Marinus Larsen (1849–?), Danish-born American Mormon leader
Marinus W.J.M. "Rinus" Peijnenburg (1928–1979), Dutch politician, minister without portfolio
Marinus Bernardus Rost van Tonningen (1852–1927), Dutch Army general in the Dutch East Indies
Marinus Willett (1740–1830), American soldier and political leader
Sports
Marinus Antonius "Mario Been (born 1963), Dutch football player and manager
Marinus "Rinus" Bennaars (born 1931), Dutch footballer
Marinus "Rinus" van den Berge (1900–1972), Dutch sprinter
Marinus Bester (born 1969), German footballer
Marinus Dijkhuizen (born 1972), Dutch football player and manager
Marinus "Rinus" Israël ((born 1942), Dutch footballer
Marinus Kraus (born 1991), German ski jumper
Marinus J.H. "Rinus" Michels (1928–2005), Dutch football player and coach, FIFA "Coach of the Century"
Marinus C. "Rinus" Paul (born 1941), Dutch cyclist
Marinus A.J. "René" Pijnen (born 1946), Dutch cyclist
Marinus van Rekum (1884–1955), Dutch tug of war competitor 
Marinus Sørensen (1898–1962), Danish sprinter
Marinus Govert "Marijn" Sterk (born 1987), Dutch footballer
Marinus Valentijn (1900–1991), Dutch road bicycle racer
Marinus "Rini" Wagtmans (born 1946),  Dutch road bicycle racer
Marinus Wanewar (born 1997), Indonesian footballer
Marinus "Mario" Westbroek (born 1961), Dutch sprinter
Other
Marinus van Dam (1929–1997), Dutch confectionery maker
Marinus Damen (1905-1985), Dutch co-founder of the Damen Shipyards Group
Marinus van der Lubbe (1909–1934), Dutch council communist, accused of setting the Reichstag fire
Marinus "Rien" den Oudsten (1890–1964), Dutch founder coach building company
 (1902–1944), Dutch World War II Resistance fighter

See also 
Marinus (disambiguation)
Rinus

References 

Masculine given names
Latin masculine given names
Ancient Roman nomina
Dutch masculine given names

de:Marinus
fr:Marinus
hu:Marinusz
pl:Marinos
zh:馬里努斯